John Stuart Penton Lumley (born September 1936) is a councilman of the City of London Corporation, where he represents the ward of Aldersgate. He is a former professor of Vascular Surgery at the University of London and former world president of the International College of Surgeons. He was a council member of the Royal College of Surgeons, chair of two academic boards of the Worshipful Company of Apothecaries, and has written or edited more than 60 medical textbooks.

References 

Living people
Councilmen and Aldermen of the City of London
1936 births
English surgeons
English medical writers